Kwai Chung Estate North is one of the 31 constituencies of the Kwai Tsing District Council in Hong Kong. The seat elects one member of the council every four years. It was first created in the 2011 elections. Its boundary is loosely based on part of Kwai Chung Estate in Kwai Chung with estimated population of 20,053.

Councillors represented

Election results

2010s

References

Constituencies of Hong Kong
Constituencies of Kwai Tsing District Council
2011 establishments in Hong Kong
Constituencies established in 2011
Kwai Chung